is a Japanese footballer who plays as a defender for YSCC Yokohama.

Club statistics
Updated to 23 February 2016.

References

External links

Profile at YSCC Yokohama

1987 births
Living people
Hosei University alumni
Association football people from Nagasaki Prefecture
Japanese footballers
J3 League players
Japan Football League players
YSCC Yokohama players
Association football defenders